Darj may refer to:
 Darj-e Olya
 Darj-e Sofla